For Those I Love is the musical project of David Balfe from Dublin, whose 2021 debut album For Those I Love was met with critical acclaim. He is a former band member of The Blind and Mothers & Fathers with Pamela Connolly of Pillow Queens. In December 2020, For Those I Love performed the project's first extended live performance as part of the Irish music festival and the TV show Other Voices. Balfe dedicated the album to his late friend, spoken word musician Paul Curran.

For Those I Love won the 2021 Choice Music Prize for their self-titled album.

Discography

Studio albums 
  For Those I Love (2021)

Extended plays 
 Into A World That Doesn't Understand it, Unless You're From It (2020)

References

Irish electronic musicians